David Conrad Coutts  is a Canadian politician who represented the electoral district of Livingstone-Macleod in the Legislative Assembly of Alberta. He is a member of the Progressive Conservative Party.  He was first elected in the 1993 election and was re-elected three times before declining to seek re-election in the 2008 vote.

References

External links
 Profile at the Legislative Assembly of Alberta

Progressive Conservative Association of Alberta MLAs
Living people
People from the Municipal District of Willow Creek No. 26
Members of the Executive Council of Alberta
1945 births
21st-century Canadian politicians